The canton of Balleroy is a former canton of the Calvados département in northwestern France. It had 10,905 inhabitants (2012). It was disbanded following the French canton reorganisation which came into effect in March 2015. Its chief town was Balleroy. 

The canton comprised 22 communes:

 Balleroy
 La Bazoque
 Bucéels
 Cahagnolles
 Campigny
 Castillon
 Chouain
 Condé-sur-Seulles
 Ellon
 Juaye-Mondaye
 Lingèvres
 Litteau
 Le Molay-Littry
 Montfiquet
 Noron-la-Poterie
 Planquery
 Saint-Martin-de-Blagny
 Saint-Paul-du-Vernay
 Tournières
 Le Tronquay
 Trungy
 Vaubadon

References

Balleroy
2015 disestablishments in France
States and territories disestablished in 2015